Jean Bart (1879/1880 – 1955; pseudonym of Marie Antoinette (de) Sarlabous) was an American playwright and screenwriter.

Her works included: 
A Prince in a Pawnshop (1916 film)
 The Flaming Omen (1917 film)
The Squall (1926; film version 1929)
Man Who Reclaimed His Head (play; film version 1934)
Verbena trágica aka Tragic Festival (1939 film)
The Mad Empress (1939 film)
Strange Confession (1945 film)

She died March 6, 1955, in New York City, at the age of 75.

External links

American dramatists and playwrights
19th-century births
1955 deaths
20th-century American screenwriters